Gowardia arctica is a species of terricolous (ground-dwelling),  fruticose (bushy) lichen in the family Parmeliaceae. Found in arctic regions of Northern Canada and Russia, it was formally described as a new species in 2009 by Pekka Halonen, Leena Myllys, Saara Velmala, and Heini Hyvärinen. It also occurs along the Arctic Ocean coast (and associated islands) of Russia. It contains alectorialic acid and two other unknown lichen products.

References

Parmeliaceae
Lichen species
Lichens described in 2009
Lichens of Subarctic America
Lichens of Eastern Europe
Lichens of the Arctic
Fungi without expected TNC conservation status